Arvelo is a surname. Notable people with the surname include:

Alberto Arvelo Torrealba (1905–1971), Venezuelan lawyer, educator, and poet
Aurora Arvelo (born 2003), Finnish rhythmic gymnast 
Enriqueta Arvelo Larriva (1886–1963), Venezuelan poet
Gremlis Arvelo, Venezuelan table tennis player
Ritva Arvelo (1921–2013), Finnish actress, film director, screenwriter, and dancer